Felix Unger (born 2 March 1946 in Klagenfurt, Austria) is a heart specialist who served as the president of the European Academy of Sciences and Arts for three decades. He is the president of Alma Mater Europaea. In 1986 he performed the first artificial heart transplantation in Europe.

Life

Unger studied medicine at University of Vienna, graduating in 1971. After graduation, he practiced at University Clinic for Cardiology in Vienna (1971, 1972) and at the local University Surgical Clinic (1972–1977) and in 1975 as a researcher in the field of Cardiovascular medicine in Houston, Cleveland and Salt Lake City in USA. In the year of 1978, he received his Ph.D, became Associate Professor (and later Full Surgical Professor). In Salt Lake City, he invented Ellipsoidherz, later used by Unger for his 1986 artificial heart transplant procedure. In 1990 he founded the European Academy of Sciences and Arts, together with Kardinal König and Professor Lobkowitz. From 1985 to 2011 he was the leader of the University Clinic for cardiac surgery in Salzburg. From 2001, he has been the president of the European Institute of Health. Prof. Unger is a member of a number of academies of science: a corresponding member of the Academy of Sciences and Arts of the German Federal State of North Rhine-Westphalia, Latvia, Slovenia and Serbia; a regular member of the German Leopoldina, Slovakia and the New York Academy of Sciences; and the world and the Montenegrin Academy of Sciences and Arts.

Awards
1975 Dr. Preis Karl Renner,
1980 Sandoz Preis,
1980 German Society of Surgery,
1982 and 1989, Planseepreis für Wissenschaft,
1991 Purkyne Medaille (Brno),
1992 Billroth Preis der Österr. Ges. F. Chirurgie,
1992 Humes Professorship,
1992 Karylins Medaille,
1992 Bundesverdienstkreuz first class
2005 Verdienstkreuz des Landes Salzburg,
2006 Austrian Decoration for Science and Art first class
2009 Paul Stradins Preis, Riga
2011 Medal of the President of the Slovak Republic
2012 Großes Silbernes Ehrenzeichen für Verdienste um die Republik Österreich

Honorary professor:
2002 in Marburg
2012 in St. Petersburg

Honorary doctorates:
1994 in Budapest, Timișoara and Tokyo,
2003 in Riga
2007 in Belgrade
2009 in Athens
2010 in Tbilisi.
2012 in St. Petersburg
2013 in Arad and Cluj-Napoca

References

External links

 Europäische Akademie der Wissenschaften und Künste

1946 births
Austrian cardiac surgeons
Living people
Officers Crosses of the Order of Merit of the Federal Republic of Germany